Mar George Valiamattam (born 16 September 1938) is an Indian prelate. He served as East Syriac Rite Catholic Archbishop Emeritus. He was appointed as the second bishop of Archdiocese of Tellicherry, upon the retirement of Mar Sebastian Valloppilly on 1 May 1989. He was promoted to the post of Metropolitan Archbishop in 1995.[1][2]

He served as the head of the Archdiocese for 25 years and retired in 2014.[3]

Early life

George Valiamattam was born on 16 September 1938 at Punnathara in the Archdiocese of Changanassery as the eldest son of Thomas and Annamma Valiamattam. His family migrated to Kodencherry in Calicut District. He studied at Nariveli and Punnathara. After his minor seminary formation at St. Mary's Minor seminary, Thop-Thrissur, he joined Carmelgiri Seminary, Aluva for Philosophical studies. His theological studies were at Urban University, Rome. He was ordained as a priest by Mar Sebastian Valloppilly on 30 November 1963 at St. Peter's Basilica, Rome. After his ordination he obtained his doctoral degree in theology from Gregorian University, Rome in 1967.

Church service

He served the diocese as assistant vicar of St. Mary's Church, Kodencherry, Vicar of St. Mary's Church, Thalanji, and Secretary to the Bishop, Chancellor of the diocese, Diocesan Director of Catechism and Mission League and as Rector of the Minor Seminary. He served the diocese of Thamarassery in the capacity of Chancellor, Secretary and Director of Catechism. When nominated the second Bishop of Tellicherry, he was the Forane Vicar at St. Thomas Forane Church, Shirady.

He was consecrated Bishop at St. Joseph's Cathedral Church Tellicherry by His Eminence Antony Cardinal Padiyara, assisted by Mar Joseph Powathil, Archbishop of Changanassery and Mar Sebastian Valloppilly, on 1 May 1989 and he assumed office on the same day. When the diocese of Tellicherry was raised to the status of Metropolitan Archdiocese, he was promoted and appointed as its first Metropolitan Archbishop on 18 May 1995. He was enthroned as the Archbishop on 24 July 1995, at a solemn ceremony in St. Joseph's Cathedral Church presided over by the Major Archbishop His Eminence Antony Cardinal Padiyara.

He served the Church in India as the Vice President of CBCI and its Standing Committee member. He was a member of the Permanent Synod of the Syro Malabar Church. He was the Episcopal advisor of INFAM since its inception in 2003 and is the Chairman of the Synodal Commission for the Good Shepherd Major Seminary, Kunnoth. At the completion of retirement age he resigned and Mar George Njaralakatt was elected as the new Archbishop on 30 September 2014.

References 

1938 births
Living people
Syro-Malabar archbishops
People from Kottayam